XHERO-FM is a radio station in Aguascalientes, Aguascalientes. Broadcasting on 98.9 FM, XHERO is owned by Radiogrupo and carries a grupera format known as La Invasora.

History
XERO-AM received its concession on November 3, 1964, originally broadcasting on 1490 AM. Sometime in the 1990s XERO moved to 1260, and then in February 2003, as part of a power increase to 10 kW day/2.5 kW night, XERO moved one final time to 1240.

XERO migrated to FM in the early 2010s as XHERO-FM 98.9.

References

Radio stations in Aguascalientes